Megan J. Povey is an English food physicist who is a professor at the University of Leeds. She is a Fellow of the Institute of Physics and founding member of the Physics in Food Manufacturing group.

Early life and education 
Povey earned her bachelor's degree in physics at Lancaster University. As a student in the 1960s, Povey became involved with political activism, campaigning against nuclear power and being part of Unite Against Fascism. Her doctorate involved work of military potential, and she was offered several research and development positions in defence contractors. Povey was not interested in these careers; being anti-war and pro civil rights, and pursued an academic career at the University of Leeds.

Research and career 
Povey joined the School of Food Science at the University of Leeds as a postdoctoral researcher in the 1970s.  There she started studying the physics of food, specialising in the application of ultrasound in both characterisation and food manufacture. She has studied the crystallisation and growth of fat. Her research combines computational and mathematical modelling to develop both food and equipment.

Povey has also studied the physical processes that underpin digestion, in an attempt to develop foods that can be digested by older people.

Povey has served as president of the University of Leeds University and College Union (UCU). She is a member of Scientists for Global Responsibility.

Selected publications 
 
 </ref>

Personal life 
Povey was born Malcolm Povey. In 2017 she transitioned to Megan.

References 

Living people
Year of birth missing (living people)
Fellows of the Institute of Physics
Academics of the University of Leeds
Alumni of Lancaster University
Transgender academics
Transgender scientists
Transgender women
20th-century British physicists
21st-century British physicists
21st-century British women scientists
English women physicists
20th-century English scientists
21st-century English scientists
20th-century English women
20th-century English people
21st-century English women